A Tori Amos Collection: Tales of a Librarian is the first retrospective compilation album by American singer-songwriter Tori Amos. Given the option to be involved in the project, Amos elected to take a central role in the production of the collection, released in 2003 on her former label Atlantic Records.

Amos described the compilation as a "sonic autobiography", a title derived from her dislike of the term "greatest hits". Recording under the premise that a librarian is a "chronicler", Amos pieced together the collection in accordance with the Dewey Decimal System; so, for example, "Sweet Dreams", which contains the lyrics "Land, land of liberty / We're run by a constipated man", is listed as "973.938: History of North America -- Politics of Illusion". Amos revisited the mixing of many of her own favorite songs from her career, focusing on those she thought were not fully realized in their original recordings and those that she felt explained her life story. Additionally, Amos added two new songs and two re-recorded B-sides: "Angels", "Snow Cherries from France", "Sweet Dreams", and "Mary", respectively. The latter two compositions were originally recorded in 1990 during sessions for Little Earthquakes (1992).

"Mary" and "Angels" were released as singles from the album.

Track listing

CD

DVD

Live

Others

Charts

Certifications

References

Tori Amos albums
2003 compilation albums
Albums produced by Eric Rosse
Atlantic Records compilation albums